The Fate of Ten is the sixth book in the Lorien Legacies series, written by James Frey and Jobie Hughes under the collective pseudonym of "Pittacus Lore". The book was first published in 2015 by HarperCollins. The Revenge of Seven precedes it, while United As One follows and is the final book of the series.

It is about a group of alien teenagers from light-years away who are now trying to save the earth and meet some good friends along the way.

Plot 

Daniela, a 15 year old girl is watching the Mogadorian attack on New York with her stepfather when a group of Mogadorians enter their building. She leaves her stepfather and stares out the window while he stays to delay the Mogadorians. But just when she's made it out the fire escape she looks back as four Mogadorians enter her apartment and they tell her to "Surrender or die." A moment later her stepfather smashes one of the Mogadorians heads in with a bat and kills one before he is shot. He tells Daniela to run and she barely makes it down the fire escape. She then runs through the streets and as she runs she comes across another three Mogadorians and she falls to the ground the Mogadorians say, "Surrender or die." as they have their guns aimed at her. Daniela throws up her hands to defend herself as a reflex and is surprised when the guns fly out of their hands and they're thrown back. Daniela manages to kill them with her newfound telekinesis.

Four's Narration
John and Sam, with the 23 civilians they saved, try to reach a makeshift encampment established on the Brooklyn Bridge. John tells them to go ahead because he and Sam still have to look for Nine and Five. The civilians leave them after expressing their gratitude. Four and Sam rest in an abandoned apartment in which they find out through television that Five and Nine might be fighting at Union Square. On the way they meet Daniela Morales, a Human-Garde, robbing a bank. They try to convince her to join their cause, but she is adamant in finding her mother first. She leads them to the subway. The Anubis starts to attack them, causing the roof to collapse onto them. John exerts all of his telekinetic strength to keep the roof up, with some help from Sam and Daniela, which causes him to pass out. While resting, Ella reaches out to John through a dream, showing John her memories of the ship Anubis. She warns him of Setrákus' plan to go to the Sanctuary in Mexico, and advises him to be strong, and to do whatever must be done to defeat Setrákus. John also witnesses the Mogadorian augmentation being carried out on Ella's body as Ella's consciousness is talking to him. John wakes up and hears Sam talking to Daniela about all John has done to protect the Loric and humans. John urges them to reach the Brooklyn Bridge camp.

Soldiers under orders from Agent Walker find them in the subway and bring them to a makeshift camp near the Brooklyn Bridge, wherein Agent Walker talks to John about Setrákus Ra's message to the world government. She tells him the US Government will help the Garde if they can help them defeat the Mogadorians within forty-eight hours, or else the government might follow Setrákus' order of surrendering Garde in order to prevent the cities from being attacked. With the help of Agent Walker, John and Sam are able to reach Six, Marina and Adam, warning them of Setrákus' arrival at the Sanctuary and telling them to flee. John also learns from Adam how to possibly attack the warships. John also contacts Sarah and requests her, Mark and Lexa to go at the Sanctuary. John passes on the information of the warships weaknesses to Agent Walker. Just then, soldiers arrive and deliver a message from Five, who attacked them. Five wants Four to meet him at the Statue of Liberty at Liberty Island, or he'll presumably kill Number Nine ("meet me at the Statue of Liberty or I'll give you another scar"). Four, Sam and Daniela meet Five in his metallic Externa state with Nine unconscious and tied up. Four heals Nine, and is about to leave when Five reveals that he is also badly injured. Four eventually heals Five with Daniela's help and ties him up for good measure. Nine wakes up and they discuss what to do to Five when a Mogadorian Hunter (Daniela calls it the "Mogasaur") rises from the bay and attacks them.

The Garde suddenly lose consciousness during the battle. It turns out to be Ella, with the help of the Lorien Entity, who connects with all the Garde telepathically to show the events between Pittacus Lore and Setrákus Ra leading to the war. They also enter a mental representation of the Elders' Chamber with new human-Gardes in attendance, wherein Four encourages them to join the fight against the Mogadorians. When Ella's power weakens, they wake up and barely miss the monster's attack. Five calls out to John and Sam, telling them he can help. When Sam cut his ties, Five targets the monster's eyes, retrieves his Loric charm and manages to save Nine from falling to the ground. Daniela suddenly has a terrible headache, and when John tries to alleviate her pain, he also feels the pain. Sam deduces that Daniela is developing a new Legacy, and Daniela opens her eyes, emitting a beam that slowly turns the monster into stone. John realizes that he is the new Pittacus Lore who has the rare ability to copy Legacies, and with that Legacy he copied from Daniela, helps her petrify the monster. Afterwards, Agent Walker tells John the US President would like to cooperate with him and the Garde, after the President's daughter witnesses his speech at the Elders Chamber in a vision. Then the satellite phone rings and John answers it first. It is Sarah calling him during the last moments of her life; she tells John she had no regrets and bleeds out.

Six's Narration
Six, Marina and Adam are stranded at the Sanctuary because Phiri Dun-Ra has sabotaged the Skimmer engines, paralyzed Dust, and is now in hiding. Adam devises an ingenious plan to trap Phiri Dun Ra and successfully captures and interrogates her to reveal where she hid the missing parts of the Skimmer jets. They find the parts but it also triggers an explosive trap set up by Phiri. Adam is fatally wounded from shielding Six and Marina, and Marina heals him first, seconds before he dies before she heals Six. They wait at the jet plane while recovering Adam tries to fix it. John reaches out to Six, warning them of Setrákus Ra's arrival at the Sanctuary, Ella's warning for them to flee, and requesting Adam to tell him any weaknesses of the Skimmer jets and Mogadorian warships. Six, Marina and Adam learn that what they did at the Sanctuary has turned Earth into the new Lorien and turned some humans into Garde.

Six and the others devise a plan to intercept Setrákus Ra with various traps. Sarah, Mark, Bernie Kosar and Lexa arrive with the Lorien spaceship to aid them. Setrákus Ra and a controlled Ella arrive and the ship promptly destroys the Temple. The Well where the Lorien Entity resides is spared from the destruction and Setrákus Ra tries to claim the Lorien's power from the well using elaborate equipment he created. Six, Marina and Adam attack him but he manages to incapacitate Marina. Adam is about to kill Setrákus Ra when Ella places herself between the equipment and the well, seemingly killing her. Six is enraged and is about to attack Setrákus Ra, when she, Adam and even Setrákus Ra suddenly lose consciousness. It is Ella, with the help of the Lorien Entity, who connects with all the Garde telepathically to show the events between Pittacus Lore and Setrákus Ra leading to the war. They also enter a mental representation of the Elders' Chamber with new human-Garde in attendance, wherein Four encourages them to join the fight against the Mogadorians. When Ella's power weakens, they wake up, six chooses to fight Setrákus Ra but then chooses to retreat. Ella wakes up! Six orders Bernie Kosar to bring Ella away to safety. Six then unleashes the strongest storm she can create, debris becomes deadly projectiles that injure Setrákus Ra. Unfortunately a piece of debris also hits Sarah and wounds her mortally. They retreat to the ship and Lexa flies them away. Mark frantically tries to awaken Marina, as only she can heal Sarah, but to no avail. Ella is crying, saying they should have followed her warning to flee. Sarah asks Six to call John via satellite phone and Sarah says goodbye to him. Sarah dies in Six's arms.

Ella's Narration
Ella thinks she is dead, remembering that she put herself between the Loric power source and the Mogadorian equipment that is sucking up its power. The Lorien Entity introduces itself to her, explaining her powers and her mission. Ella then connects with all the hundreds of Human-Garde and the current Garde telepathically to show the events between Pittacus Lore and Setrákus Ra leading to the war.

Pittacus Lore and Setrákus Ra were friends, however Setrákus Ra was obsessed with discovering how to harness Lorien's power to grant powers to non-Garde like his wife, Celwe. Pittacus should have executed Setrákus Ra, but became merciful instead and exiled him. Years later, Celwe came back to Lorien with her daughter, who became Ella's grandmother. 

Ella is able to create a mental representation of the Elders' Chamber, and brings in the consciousness of all Garde to convene. She also brings in Setrákus Ra, bound and with his head covered. She is able to translate in different languages and communicate simultaneously to hundreds of people using telepathy. With her help, Four encourages the Garde to join the fight against the Mogadorians. When Ella's power weakens, Setrákus Ra manages to release himself from Ella's mental binds and threatens the Garde. Ella disconnects their mental link and the Garde awake. 

Ella is later brought back to life by the Lorien Entity and Six, upon seeing her alive, orders Bernie Kosar to bring Ella away to safety. Inside the ship Lexa has brought, Ella is crying, presumably because she has foreseen Sarah's death in the future, thus her warning for the Garde not to engage in a fight with Setrákus Ra and her advice to John in his dream to remain strong.

References

Fantasy books
Lorien Legacies
2015 fiction books